(also referred to as VP-2 or Fleet Air Squadron 2) is a unit of the Japanese Maritime Self-Defence Force. It is a part of Fleet Air Wing 4 and is based at JMSDF Hachinohe Air Base in Aomori Prefecture. It is equipped with Lockheed P-3C Orion aircraft.

Squadron structure
The squadron comprises two flights, both equipped with P-3 aircraft:
 21st flight
 22nd flight

Aircraft used
 Grumman TBF Avenger (1957-1958)
 Lockheed P-2V-7 Neptune (1958-?)
 Lockheed P-2J (1971-?)
 Lockheed P-3C Orion (1986-)

References

Aviation in Japan
Units and formations of the Japan Maritime Self-Defense Force
Military units and formations established in 1957